Ngila Beryl Dickson  (born 1958) is a costume designer from New Zealand.

Her most notable work is in The Lord of the Rings: The Return of the King and The Lord of the Rings: The Fellowship of the Ring, both of which were filmed in New Zealand, as well as her years of work on Xena: Warrior Princess.

She and Richard Taylor won the Academy Award for Best Costume Design for the Lord of the Rings: The Return of the King (2004). Other Academy Award nominations were for Lord of the Rings: The Fellowship of the Ring (2002) and The Last Samurai (2004).

She received British Film and Television Award nominations for Lord of the Rings: The Fellowship of the Ring (2002)  and Lord of the Rings: The Return of the King (2004).

She and Richard Taylor won a BAFTA for Lord of the Rings: The Two Towers (2003). She won the Costume Designers Guild Award for Lord of the Rings: The Return of the King (2004)

Dickson is married to Hamish Keith.

In the 2004 Queen's Birthday Honours, Dickson was appointed an Officer of the New Zealand Order of Merit, for services to design and the film industry.

Filmography 
 Peter Pan & Wendy (2022)
 Terminator: Dark Fate (2019)
 Asura (2018)
 Crouching Tiger, Hidden Dragon: Sword of Destiny (2016)
 Dracula Untold (2014)
 Green Lantern (2011)
 The International (2009)
 Fool's Gold (2008)
 Blood Diamond (2006)
 The Illusionist (2006)
 Without a Paddle (2004)
 The Lord of the Rings: The Return of the King (2003)
 The Last Samurai (2003)
 The Extreme Team (2003)
 The Lord of the Rings: The Two Towers (2002)
 The Lord of the Rings: The Fellowship of the Ring (2001)
 Young Hercules (1998)
 Xena: Warrior Princess (1995–1999)
 Mysterious Island (1995)
 Hercules: The Legendary Journeys (1995)
 Peach (1995)
 Heavenly Creatures (1994)
 Jack Be Nimble (1993)
 Crush (1992)
 The Rainbow Warrior (1992)
 My Grandfather is a Vampire (1991)
 User Friendly (1990)
 Ruby and Rata (1990)
 The Rainbow Warrior Conspiracy (1989)

Notes

External links
 

1958 births
Living people
Officers of the New Zealand Order of Merit
New Zealand costume designers
Women costume designers
Mass media people from Dunedin
Best Costume Design Academy Award winners
Best Costume Design BAFTA Award winners
20th-century New Zealand women artists
21st-century New Zealand women artists
New Zealand film people